Nazar-ul-Islam (1939 – 11 January 1994) was a Pakistani film director known for his movies like, "Ehsaas"(1972), "Sharafat"(1974), "Aina", and "Bandish"(1980).

Early life
Nazar-ul-Islam was born in Calcutta in 1939 and later migrated to East Pakistan (now Bangladesh). In 1971, after the separation of East Pakistan, he settled in Lahore.

Career
Nazar-ul-Islam started his career as a film editor in the 1960s in Dhaka. He directed his first Urdu movie, "Kajal" in 1966. His other notable Urdu movie in Dhaka was, "Piyasa"(1969). After 1971, he became the most successful film director of Lollywood in the decades of 1970s and 1980s.  His successful films include: Ehsaas (1972), Sharafat (1974), Ambar (1979), Bandish (1980), Nahin Abhi Nahin (1980), Do Deewane (1982), and Kalay Chor (1991). Nazar-ul-Islam brought a realistic approach to filmmaking and experimented with new themes for Urdu movies. His movie, "Aina"(1977) became a record-setting mega-hit in the history of Pakistani cinema. It reigned on the box office for a total of 401 weeks after being released on March 18, 1977.

Filmography
Nazar-ul-Islam directed 30 Urdu, Bengali, and Punjabi films. Some of his popular movies are:
 1970: Darpochurno (Bengali)
 1971: Shorolipi  (Bengali)
 1972: Ehsaas (Urdu)
 1974: Sharafat (Urdu)
 1974: Haqeeqat (Urdu)
 1977: Aaina (Urdu)
 1978: Amber (Urdu)
 1978: Zindagi (Urdu)	
 1980: Bandish (Urdu)
 1980: Nahin Abhi Nahin (Urdu)
 1982: Aangan (Urdu)
 1983: Love Story (Urdu)
 1985: Deewanay do (Urdu)
 1985: Palkon Ki Chhaon Mein (Urdu)
 1985: Zamin Aasman (Urdu)
 1989: Madam Bawari (Punjabi)
 1989: Barood Ki Chhaon Mein (Urdu)
 1991: Kalay Chor (Punjabi)

Awards
Nazar-ul-Islam received 4 'Best Director' Nigar awards for the following movies: 
 Ehsaas (1972)
 Sharafat (1974)
 Aaina (1977)
 Madam Bawari (1989)

Death
Nazar-ul-Islam died on January 11, 1994, and was buried in Lahore.

See also
List of Pakistani film directors

References

1939 births
1994 deaths
People from Kolkata
Pakistani film directors
Nigar Award winners